State Route 142 (SR 142) is a 24.59 mile long east-west state highway in West Tennessee.

Route description

SR 142 begins in McNairy County in Selmer at an intersection with US 45/SR 5 south of downtown. It goes east to leave Selmer and pass through first farmland, then wooded areas, to pass through Stantonville, where it has a short concurrency with SR 224. The highway then turns southeast to pass through West Shiloh, where it has an intersection with SR 117, before crossing into Hardin County. SR 142 immediately enters Hurley and comes to an intersection and becomes concurrent with SR 22. They go south along the western edge of Shiloh National Military Park to arrive at Shiloh, where SR 142 splits off and goes south through wooded and hilly areas to pass by Childers Hill to enter Southside and come to an intersection with SR 57. It goes west along SR 57 for a short distance before turning south again through wooded areas to come to an end at the Mississippi state line, where it continues as Alcorn County Road 100 to Mississippi Highway 350 (MS 350), which is less than half a mile away, and the town of Farmington. The entire route of SR 142 is a two-lane highway.

Major intersections

References

142
Transportation in McNairy County, Tennessee
Transportation in Hardin County, Tennessee